Oleksandr Valeriyovych Zubkov (born 3 August 1996) is a Ukrainian professional footballer who plays as a midfielder for Shakhtar Donetsk.

Club career
Zubkov is a product of the Olimpik Donetsk and Shakhtar Donetsk Youth Sportive School Systems.

In 2013, he signed a contract with Shakhtar, and played in the Shakhtar Donetsk reserves. Zubkov made his debut as the substituted player in the main-squad team in a match against Zorya Luhansk on 15 May 2016 in the Ukrainian Premier League.

Ferencváros
At the end of spring of 2019 Zubkov joined Hungarian club Ferencváros on loan. After the successful loan which saw him become the club's top scorer, Ferencváros exercised the option to sign him permanently. The fee was believed to be around €1.5 million.

On 16 June 2020, he became champion with Ferencváros by beating Budapest Honvéd FC at the Hidegkuti Nándor Stadion on the 30th match day of the 2019–20 Nemzeti Bajnokság I season.

On 29 September 2020, he was member of the Ferencváros team which qualified for the 2020–21 UEFA Champions League group stage after beating Molde FK 3–3 on aggregate (away goals) at the Groupama Aréna.

Return to Shakhtar Donetsk
On 5 August 2022, Zubkov returned to Shakhtar Donetsk, by signing a contract until the summer of 2027. On 5 October, he scored his first Champions League goal in a 2–1 defeat against Real Madrid. On 11 October, he scored the leading goal for Shakhtar from a header against Real Madrid, before the latter managed to equalize in the 90+5th minute, in a match which ended in a 1–1 draw.

International career
Zubkov made his debut for the Ukraine national team on 7 October 2020 in a friendly against France.

Career statistics

International

As of match played 24 September 2022. Ukraine score listed first, score column indicates score after each Zubkov goal.

Honours
Ferencváros
 Nemzeti Bajnokság I: 2019–20, 2020–21, 2021–22
 Magyar Kupa: 2021–22

Shakhtar Donetsk
 Ukrainian Premier League: 2016–17, 2017–18
 Ukrainian Cup: 2015–16, 2016–17, 2017–18
 Ukrainian Super Cup: 2015, 2017

Shakhtar Donetsk Youth
 UEFA Youth League runner-up: 2014–15

References

External links

1996 births
Living people
Ukrainian footballers
Ukraine international footballers
Ukraine youth international footballers
Ukraine under-21 international footballers
UEFA Euro 2020 players
FC Shakhtar Donetsk players
Ukrainian Premier League players
Sportspeople from Makiivka
Association football midfielders
FC Mariupol players
Nemzeti Bajnokság I players
Ferencvárosi TC footballers
Ukrainian expatriate footballers
Expatriate footballers in Hungary
Ukrainian expatriate sportspeople in Hungary
Ukrainian people of Russian descent